Bahadur Edulji Kapadia (9 April 1900 – 1 January 1973) was an Indian cricketer who played first-class cricket from 1920 to 1935.

Kapadia was a wicket-keeper and useful lower middle-order batsman. As India's reserve wicketkeeper to Janardan Navle on their first Test touring team in 1932, his opportunities were limited. He played most of his first-class cricket for the Parsees in the Bombay Quadrangular from 1920-21 to 1935-36, and was a member of their championship-winning teams in 1922-23 and 1928-29.

References

External links
 
 

1900 births
1973 deaths
Indian cricketers
Parsees cricketers
Cricketers from Mumbai